Khaderpet is one of the locality of Vaniyambadi in Vellore District, Tamil Nadu. All important places of Vaniyambadi like bus stand and railway station, police station, daily bazaar and weekly market are located here. The office of Vaniyambadi (State Assembly Constituency) is located here. Periyapet is 1.5 km from here.

Villages in Vellore district